Mink Lake Water Aerodrome  is located on Mink Lake  east of Carleton, Nova Scotia, Canada.

References

Registered aerodromes in Nova Scotia
Transport in Yarmouth County
Buildings and structures in Yarmouth County
Seaplane bases in Nova Scotia